Wireless Thessaloniki is an experimental wireless community network growing in the air of Thessaloniki, Greece. It is one of the first wireless networks deployed in the city.

It was founded by Konstantinos Natsakis and Athanasios Kanaris on November, 2002. The primary goals of this project was twofold:
Development of a floppy linux distribution that would provide encryption better than WEP
Construction of low-cost antennas and routers based on old PCs, placed in water resist boxes in order to be placed on rooftops

The linux floppy distribution formed, named Paladir, was named after the palantíri in J. R. R. Tolkien's The Lord of the Rings, as it provided insight to other wireless routers running Paladir.

The first wireless link, connecting two points with distance of 4.5 km, was achieved on March 1, 2003, in 11 Mbit/s.

Since then, the wthess network counts more than 20 nodes sparged on rooftops of the city. It is connected with TWMN and SWN to provide connectivity with other community networks, and it is also connected through wired network with AWMN and other
wireless communities in Greece.

See also 
 Athens Wireless Metropolitan Network
 Heraklion Student Wireless Network
 Patras Wireless Network
 Thessaloniki Wireless Metropolitan Network

External links 
Wireless Thessaloniki Network website (mostly in Greek)

Wireless community networks
Thessaloniki society